WNUW-LP (98.5 FM) is a radio station licensed to serve the community of Aston, Pennsylvania. The station is owned by Neumann University. It airs a variety radio format.

The station was assigned the call sign WRNU-LP by the Federal Communications Commission on February 18, 2014. On June 24, 2014, the station changed its call sign to WNUW-LP

References

External links
 Official Website
 

NUW-LP
NUW-LP
Radio stations established in 2015
2015 establishments in Pennsylvania
NUW-LP
Variety radio stations in the United States
Delaware County, Pennsylvania